This is a list of the extreme points of Singapore, the points that are farther north, south, east, or west than any other location in the country. Also included are extreme points in elevation. Both the extreme points for the main island (Pulau Ujong) and the outlying islands of Singapore are indicated.

Northernmost
 Coast of Sembawang, near the Senoko Industrial Estate northernmost point in Singapore
 Sembawang – northernmost residential area in Singapore
 Sembawang MRT station – northernmost MRT station in Singapore
Sembawang Bus Interchange – northernmost bus interchange in Singapore
 Kranji Reservoir – northernmost reservoir
 Pulau Ujong – northernmost island in Singapore
 Pulau Seletar – northernmost island outside the main island
 Simpang Kiri – northernmost river/stream in Singapore

Southernmost
 Pulau Satumu – southernmost point/island in Singapore (1.1594868, 103.7406081)
 Tuas – southernmost point of the main island
 Sentosa Cove – southernmost residential area in Singapore
 HarbourFront MRT station – southernmost MRT station in Singapore (1.2653894, 103.8215302)
 Beach Station Bus Terminal – southernmost bus terminal in Singapore
 HarbourFront Bus Interchange – southernmost bus interchange on the main island
 Marina Reservoir – southernmost reservoir in Singapore (1.2868653, 103.8672156)
 Singapore River – southernmost river/stream in Singapore (1.2925211, 103.8346514)

Easternmost
 Pedra Branca – easternmost island/point in Singapore (1.3304872, 104.4061449)
 Changi Bay – easternmost point on the main island
 Changi Village – easternmost residential area in Singapore (1.3887059, 103.9879802)
 Changi Airport MRT station – easternmost MRT station in Singapore (1.3574790, 103.9878836)
 Changi Airport PTB 1, 2 and 3 Bus Terminal – easternmost bus terminal in Singapore
 Changi Creek Reservoir – easternmost reservoir in Singapore (1.3858650, 103.9949888)
 Sungei Changi – easternmost river/stream in Singapore (1.3906376, 103.9893790)

Westernmost
 Tuas – westernmost point in Singapore
 Jurong West – westernmost residential area in Singapore
 Tuas Link MRT station – westernmost MRT station in Singapore (1.3408824, 103.6369914)
 Tuas Bus Terminal – westernmost bus terminal in Singapore (1.3416562, 103.6393400)
 Tengeh Reservoir – westernmost reservoir in Singapore (1.3457776, 103.6469504)
 Sungei Ulu Pandan – westernmost river/stream in Singapore (1.3247995, 103.7559847)

Extremes in elevation
 Bukit Timah Hill (about 163 metres) – highest point in Singapore
 Singapore Strait, Strait of Johor (0 metres/sea level) – lowest point in Singapore

Other
 Geographic center of Singapore island: approximately the midway of the MacRitchie Reservoir and the Upper Peirce Reservoir

See also
 Extreme points of Asia
 Extreme points of Earth
 Geography of Singapore

Notes

Singapore
Geography of Singapore
Extreme